Artesia High School may refer to:

Artesia High School (New Mexico), Artesia, New Mexico
Artesia High School (California), Lakewood, California